The 2016 World Deaf Football Championships were the third edition of the international competition of deaf football national men's and women's teams. They were organized by the International Committee of Sports for the Deaf (CISS), and were held in Agropoli, Capaccio and Salerno in Italy between 19 June and 2 July 2016. In the men's championship, Turkey won the title for the second time, defeating Germany in the final, Russia became bronze medalist before Argentina. In the women's championship, the United States  won the title for the second time, defeating Russia in the final, Great Britain became bronze medalist before Poland.

Rankings

Men

Women

References

2016
International association football competitions hosted by Italy
2016 in disability sport
Deaf
2016 in association football
World Deaf Football Championship
World Deaf Football Championship